Arvid Brodersen (September 22, 1904 – July 2, 1996) was a Norwegian sociologist, a UNESCO leader, and later a professor at the New School for Social Research in New York City.

Born in Trondheim, Brodersen studied sociology at the University of Berlin. During World War II he was a member of the Norwegian resistance movement, and is known for establishing a communication channel to central Wehrmacht officers. He died in Oslo.

Selected works
Mellom frontene (1979)

References

1904 births
1996 deaths
People from Trondheim
Norwegian expatriates in the United States
Norwegian resistance members
Norwegian sociologists
The New School faculty